Wuanita Smith (January 1, 1866 – February 18, 1959) was an American painter, printmaker, and illustrator of children's books. Her work is held in the National Gallery of Art and the Nelson-Atkins Museum of Art.

Biography 
Smith was born in Philadelphia on January 1, 1866, and was the daughter of an oil refinery operator. After finishing grammar school, Smith attended and graduated from the Philadelphia School of Design for Women. In 1887, she worked her first job as a jewelry designer.

Smith later attended the Pennsylvania Academy of the Fine Arts and the Drexel Institute.  She studied with Howard Pyle, Hugh Breckenridge, Ralph Pearson and exhibited at Drexel Institute of Art, Science, and Industry along with other female artists. She belonged to The Plastic Club, an arts organization in Philadelphia, Pennsylvania. Her aquatint picture Approaching Storm is at the National Gallery of Art. Her woodcut print Skating is part of the Nelson-Atkins Museum of Art collection.

She died on February 18, 1959, in Philadelphia, at the age of 94.

Gallery

Bibliography
The Four Corners Abroad by Amy Ella Blanchard, part of the Four Corners series, illustrated by Wuanita Smith (G.W. Jacobs, 1909)At least three books from the Admiral's Granddaughter Series by Elizabeth Lincoln GouldThe Admiral's Granddaughter (1907), illustrated by Wuanita SmithThe Admiral's Little Housekeeper (1910), illustrated by Wuanita Smith, about the Beaumont family Christmas The Admiral's Little Secretary (1911), illustrated by Wuanita SmithThe Little Runaways At Home (1912) by Alice Turner CurtisA Little Maid of Massachusetts Colony (1915)Oh, Virginia! (1920) by Helen Sherman GriffithBrothers Grimm and other stories (1922)Grandpa's Little Girls and Their Friends'' (1925) by Alice Turner Curtis

References

1866 births
1959 deaths
20th-century American women artists
American illustrators
American women illustrators
Artists from Philadelphia
American children's book illustrators
20th-century American painters
Painters from Pennsylvania
Pennsylvania Academy of the Fine Arts alumni
Philadelphia School of Design for Women alumni
Drexel University alumni